Fred Frise Stenson (26 July 1914 – 5 June 1990) was a Progressive Conservative party member of the House of Commons of Canada. He was a farmer by career.

He was first elected at the Peterborough riding in
the 1962 general election, then re-elected there in 1963. Stenson was defeated in the 1965 election by Hugh Faulkner of the Liberal party. 

He died in 1990 in Peterborough.

References 
 

1914 births
1990 deaths
Members of the House of Commons of Canada from Ontario
People from Peterborough, Ontario
Progressive Conservative Party of Canada MPs